Faredin Ibrahim (born 30 April 1952) is a Romanian boxer. He competed in the men's bantamweight event at the 1976 Summer Olympics.

References

1952 births
Living people
Romanian male boxers
Olympic boxers of Romania
Boxers at the 1976 Summer Olympics
Sportspeople from Constanța
Bantamweight boxers